Nick Sadler is a British cinematographer.

Filmography 

 Wedding Belles (Pirates of the Caribbean) (2006) dir Jim Byrkit
 Intellectual Property (2006) dir Nicholas Peterson
 The Victoria's Secret Fashion Show (2005) dir Hamish Hamilton
 Maroon 5: Friday the 13th - Live at the Santa Barbara Bowl (2005) dir Russell Thomas
 Snaps (2005) dir Simon Lewis
 Spivs (2004) (second unit) dir Colin Teague
 Trauma (2004) (additional photography) dir Marc Evans
 Norah Jones & the Handsome Band Live (2004)
 The Silent Treatment (2003) dir Peter Lydon
 Me, You and the Dead (2002) dir Rick Griffiths
 White Bits (2002) dir Alex Jovy
 Buffalo Soldiers (2001) (second unit) dir Gregor Jordan
 Dumping Elaine (2001) dir Peter Lydon
 Shockers: Parent's Night (2001) dir Marc Charach
 The Corrs: Unplugged (2000) dir Nick Wickham
 REM: Uptake (1999) dir Nick Wickham
 Coming Home (1998) (second unit) dir Giles Foster

Awards for Cinematography

 Australian International Film Festival Silver Spotlight Award - Intellectual Property (2006)

External links

Living people
1965 births
English cinematographers